Fairfield Lake State Park is a state park located in Freestone County, Texas, United States, northeast of Fairfield on the shores of Fairfield Lake.

History
The park was acquired in 1954 by a Department of Army lease, which extended it until 2004. Texas Power and Light Company (now known as Luminant) constructed a dam at Big Brown Creek to impound water as a cooling source for the nearby Big Brown Power Plant. The dam was completed in 1969. The park was opened to the public in 1976.

In the early 1830s, the area was important to Anglo settlers, particularly as a route to Texas and the American southwest. It was also an area of cattle trails.

There are several historical locations in the park, including an historical marker located in the Chancellor Union Cemetery on the park property. This has the graves of many early settlers from the area, including Civil War, WWI, and WWII veterans. The cemetery is still actively used but not maintained by the park. In the Springfield camp loop is an old well left over from the Hill family homestead.

It was announced in February 2023 that the park will close effective February 28, 2023, after the notification was given that the lease agreement will be ending.

Recreation
The park offers nature programs throughout the year. It has facilities for picnicking, nature study, hiking, biking, fishing, kayaking, paddle boarding, swimming, boating, tubing, jet skiing, water skiing, wildlife observation, horseback trails, wildlife photography, group events, RV camping, tent camping, and primitive camping.

Facilities at the park include a 2,400 acre lake, shaded picnic sites, protected swim beach, playground areas, 136 campsites, primitive camping area, dump station, outdoor amphitheater, a fishing pier, two boat launches, two fish cleaning stations, two courtesy docks, Paddle EZ kayak and paddleboard rentals, rentable dining hall, and over 18 miles of trails to hike, bike, or explore on horseback. Each of the 136 campsites is provided with an RV pad, standing grill, fire ring with grill, and picnic table. All three camping loops have restroom and shower facilities. Water and electric sites are 30amp hookups. Water-only sites are in the Springfield camping loop and do not allow generators to be run, but batteries are permitted.

See also
List of Texas state parks

References

External links
 Official site

State parks of Texas
Protected areas of Freestone County, Texas